Prestolee is a small village in Kearsley, within the Metropolitan Borough of Bolton, in Greater Manchester, England. It lies on the River Irwell and is one of a cluster of villages between Bolton and Kearsley, which includes Stoneclough and Ringley.

Historically part of Lancashire, during the Middle Ages, Prestolee was a chapelry within the ancient ecclesiastical parish of Prestwich-cum-Oldham.

Prestolee is surrounded almost completely by water and is effectively an island, with the River Irwell to the north, west and south and the Manchester, Bolton & Bury Canal to the northeast. There is one road (Bridge Street) that provides vehicle access over the River Irwell. Prestolee Road also allows access to the village via a small canal bridge but the road is not metalled and not practical for most vehicles. Pedestrian access from the north is facilitated by using Prestolee Aqueduct, or the nearby Pack Horse Bridge.

Many countryside walks radiate from Prestolee with particular focus upon the industrial heritage of this region. Not long ago the area was severely damaged by pollution but with the coming of the Clean Air Act and the demise of the cotton mills the river has once again regained its fish and other wildlife and wild flowers abound.

It has a church (Holy Trinity) that was used by TV show Coronation Street as a venue for many weddings and known to fans as All Saints' Church, Weatherfield. It also has a primary school.

As well as the church, its other major landmark is Kearsley Mill, a cotton spinning mill in its previous guise, now home to several industrial uses. At one time there were also two other mills located on the banks of the Irwell to the right of the road bridge from Stoneclough, though these mills were demolished in the 1970s to make way for housing. Prestolee has various shops in or just outside the village, including a greengrocer's, a chip shop (now a takeaway) and a sweet shop later becoming a butcher's before ending as a village community centre. There is a pub, the Grapes Hotel, to the Stoneclough end of the bridge and several others in the near vicinity.

Prestolee has a small primary school. There is a fascinating book about the history of Prestolee school, which was run for very many years by Edward O'Neill, who believed children should be self-directed in their education. The book is called The Idiot Teacher and is by Gerard Holmes. It's particularly interesting because some experimental schools of this type such as Dartington were famous, whereas this school was ordinary, not fee-paying and not famous, but just as revolutionary.

Villages in Greater Manchester
Geography of the Metropolitan Borough of Bolton